The Passionate Stranger (U.S. A Novel Affair) is a 1957 British drama film, directed by Muriel Box and starring Margaret Leighton and Ralph Richardson.  It uses the film within a film device, with the "real" part of the plot shot in black-and-white and the "fictional" element in colour.  The interior scenes were shot at Shepperton Studios, with location filming taking place at Chilworth, Surrey.

Box stated that the film was intended "to debunk the sentimental novel...a mild satire on romance as opposed to reality, and the unhappy consequences of confusing the two".

Plot
Carlo, an Italian man, is taken on as a chauffeur at an English country mansion, the home of Roger and Judith Wynter. She is a novelist who pens torrid escapist romantic fiction for the popular women's market, although in real life she is a respectable, unassuming woman, happily married to husband Roger who has been stricken with polio that leaves him immobile.  She uses people she knows and situations she encounters as the raw material for her fictional flights of fancy. Judith is working on her latest novel titled The Passionate Stranger, a lurid tale of a bored and unsatisfied woman, with a pompous, disabled husband she despises, who embarks on a wild affair with her Italian chauffeur.

When Carlo later drives Judith to London to see her publisher, she goes to lunch leaving a copy of the manuscript in the car. Carlo finds and reads it. As he reads, the black-and-white film fades into a colour film of her novel:

The chauffeur, Mario, is driving the mistress back from London when a tyre bursts, and they are obliged to rent rooms in a small village pub. When she phones her husband Lord Hathaway, he is very cold and is only concerned about his need for the car the next morning. Lady Hathaway joins the chauffeur at a local fete where they dance together, and at the end of the evening Mario seduces her. Later, Lord Hathaway is shocked when, after a faint, the doctor informs Lord Hathaway that his wife is pregnant. When she confesses it is Mario's, he wants to dismiss him and raise the child as their own. Learning that Lady Hathaway is pregnant, Mario asks her to leave her husband and go away with him, but she says she will be loyal to her husband. So Mario plots to kill him, sabotaging his wheelchair, and tricking him into heading to the summerhouse which involves a slope. Lady Hathaway later finds him floating in the lake.

The film returns to black-and-white, and Carlo jumps to the conclusion that Judith harbours a repressed passion for him. Before their journey home, he puts sugar in the petrol tank and the car duly breaks down, but Judith refuses to leave the car. She accepts a lift from a passing motorist to take her to the nearest village, leaving Carlo with the car. He eventually reaches the pub where Judith has taken them rooms for the night, but she refuses his invitation to leave and attend a local dance, and so he goes alone. When they arrive home next day, Judith tells her husband that the pub landlord spotted Carlo wandering around the garden in the dark, and wants him to dismiss him, but Roger insists there must have been an innocent explanation.

Undaunted, Carlo continues to try to romance Judith, and to her bewilderment and alarm, he attempts to recreate situations and conversations from her novel. When she again brushes off his attentions, he becomes confused and angry. Eventually, Carlo proclaims his love and stresses her husband's inability to have children, but she tells him she loves her husband and they have two boys away at boarding school who will be returning the next day.

When she finds Roger's wheelchair in the lake, Judith at first thinks Carlo has again enacted the plot of her novel, but in fact her son accidentally ran it into the lake and Carlo has rescued him. Judith is most grateful, and Carlo expresses his undying love for her, but again she rejects him, and he decides he must leave. He boards a bus and finds himself sitting next to the Wynters' maid. Looks pass between them, and Carlo smiles.

Cast

 Ralph Richardson as Roger Wynter / Sir Clement Hathaway
 Margaret Leighton as Judith Wynter / Leonie Hathaway
 Patricia Dainton as Emily / Betty
 Carlo Giustini as Carlo / Mario (dubbed by Robert Rietti, uncredited)
 Ada Reeve as Old Woman
 Andrée Melly as Marla
 Frederick Piper as Mr. Poldy
 Michael Shepley as Miles Easter
 Thorley Walters as Jimmy

 George Woodbridge as Landlord
 Allan Cuthbertson as Dr. Stevenson
 John Arnatt as Maurice Lamport / Martin
 Barbara Archer as Doris the barmaid
 Marjorie Rhodes as Mrs. Poldy
 Megs Jenkins as Millie
 Michael Trubshawe as 2nd Landlord 
 Alexander Gauge as MC at Dance

Production
Leighton's casting was announced in May, 1956.

Critical reception
New York Times film critic Bosley Crowther understood the writers' intention, but described the premise as "thin and even tedious" and remarked that the lengthy central fantasy sequence "is so ponderous, and it so completely outweighs the little black-and-white whimsy that surrounds it, that it drags down the whole idea." He did, however, concede that "thanks to adroit performances by Miss Leighton and Sir Ralph...this little bit of nonsense from Muriel and Sydney Box is not quite as flimsy and pretentious as it may at first sound." Allmovie described the film as "something of a comic precursor to The French Lieutenant's Woman". Sky Movies commented that "Ralph Richardson delivers more than the script can reasonably expect."

References

External links 
 
 
 

1957 films
1957 drama films
British drama films
British Lion Films films
Films directed by Muriel Box
Films produced by Peter Rogers
Films scored by Humphrey Searle
Films with screenplays by Sydney Box
Films with screenplays by Muriel Box
1950s English-language films
1950s British films